Bartlett Aircraft Corp. was a US aircraft manufacturer founded in Rosemead, California in 1941 to build light aircraft from designs acquired from the purchase of Taubman Aircraft, who in turn bought them from Babcock Airplane Corporation.

World War II interrupted plans for mass production and although another attempt to resume production was made at the end of hostilities, nothing came of this.

Aircraft
Bartlett Zephyr

References

 
 aerofiles.com,Babcock, Babcock-Vlchek 
 

Defunct aircraft manufacturers of the United States
Technology companies based in Greater Los Angeles
Defunct companies based in Greater Los Angeles
Rosemead, California
Vehicle manufacturing companies established in 1941
Technology companies established in 1941
1941 establishments in California
American companies established in 1941